The Other Side of Darkness is Decyfer Down's fourth album, released on April 1, 2016. This is the band's first independent album, and it's also their first record to feature Benjamin Millhouse (formerly of Wolves at the Gate).

Background 
On September 26, 2015, Decyfer Down announced an upcoming EP consisting of six songs, which would be their first independent EP. They started a campaign on IndieGogo to get some support via Crowd Funding. On October 23, 2015, they announced that they added four bonus tracks to the project, and converted the EP to an album, consisting of ten songs.

They released an acoustic version of the song "Anchor Me", exclusively to people who contributed to their campaign. Contributors also received an acoustic EP by the end of April.

On September 4, 2016, "Anchor Me" reached No. 4 on the Billboard Christian National Rock Airplay chart, and four days later, the song went up to No. 3. By November 30, 2016, the song went up to No. 2.

Critical reception

Ben Rickaby, allotting the album four stars at HM Magazine, writes, "After reconnecting with fans on the City Rockfest Tour last year, they rekindled the spark, hit the studio and came out with the spectacular The Other Side of Darkness...With The Other Side of Darkness, Decyfer Down has done one of the hardest things for a band: evolve their sound while still maintaining a firm grasp of what’s so great about their earlier music." Indicating in a four star review from CCM Magazine, Andy Argyrakis says, "Decyfer Down makes a bold, authentic and endlessly compelling case that God's love can truly trump any degree of darkness." Christopher Smith, signaling in a four star review at Jesus Freak Hideout, writes, "With Crash feeling rushed and uneven and Scarecrow being a departure from their typical sound, The Other Side of Darkness is the proper follow-up to the Caleb-led End of Grey. It's more straightforward modern rock than the post-grunge sound the band has largely been known for, but it's a solid rock album that holds up well over several dozen listens." Rewarding the album with a four star rating by Jesus Freak Hideout, Michael Weaver states, "Decyfer Down is back again with The Other Side of Darkness, an album that casts aside any notion of the post-grunge of End of Grey and Crash, and embraces a hard modern rock sound...For one who is over post-grunge rock, The Other Side of Darkness is Decyfer Down's best work to date."

Ken Wiegman, reviewing the album for Alpha Omega News, says, "The new music they played that night was energetic and promising. And so far, the new album, 'The Other Side of Darkness' does not fail to live up to the level of anticipation that was born that night." Awarding the album four stars at New Release Today, Jonathan J. Francesco states, "This is pure, unapologetic rock, and it succeeds at delivering exactly what it sets out to." Chris Major, giving the album four and a half stars from The Christian Beat, writes, "Expressing our pain, our struggle, His victory, and His faithfulness, The Other Side of Darkness is intense, energetic, and moving...Once again, Decyfer Down has created a masterpiece of a collection." Rating the album a 71 out of 100 for Jesus Wired, Christopher "Topher P." Parks says, "The Other Side of Darkness is a decent effort and among Decyfer Down's better records, and yet it still doesn't feel like a top-notch release. Even at its best moments, there's nothing that sets The Other Side of Darkness apart from any other recent rock album, and that is its biggest weakness." Abby Baracskai, bestowing a four star rating upon the album from Today's Christian Entertainment, writes, "The Other Side of Darkness should bring joy to any fan of Christian Rock music and any music lover who enjoys well-crafted lyrics."

Track listing

Singles 
On November 27, 2015, they released a single from the album, called "Nothing More", which went on to peak the Christian Rock charts. It ranked No. 8 on ChristianRock.Net in top 30 for a week. On March 14, 2016, the band uploaded the official lyric video for this song.

On April 5, 2016, Decyfer Down announced that "Nothing More" had reached No. 5 on the charts.

Personnel

Main artists 
 TJ Harris - lead vocals, backing vocals, acoustic guitars, piano
 Brandon Mills - backing vocals, rhythm guitars, lead guitars, acoustic guitars, synth
 Christopher Clonts - backing vocals, rhythm guitars, lead guitars
 Chris Furr - bass guitar
 Benjamin Millhouse - drums, percussion

Additional artists 
 Joey West(Disciple) - recorded drums on "Nothing More", "Rearrange", "Anchor Me" and "Other Side of Darkness".

Chart performance

References

2016 albums
Decyfer Down albums